
Year 497 (CDXCVII) was a common year starting on Wednesday (link will display the full calendar) of the Julian calendar. At the time, it was known as the Year of the Consulship of Anastasius without colleague (or, less frequently, year 1250 Ab urbe condita). The denomination 497 for this year has been used since the early medieval period, when the Anno Domini calendar era became the prevalent method in Europe for naming years.

Events 
 By place 
 Byzantine Empire 
 Emperor Anastasius I gives formal recognition to the Ostrogoth king Theodoric the Great, as his representative (viceroy) in Italy. He sends the imperial standard to Ravenna. Theodoric respects the agreement and allows Roman citizens within the Ostrogothic Kingdom to be subject to Roman law.
 Isaurian War: Anastasius I regains control of the Isauria region (Asia Minor) and has the rebel leaders executed. He pacifies the mountain strongholds of the Isaurians, ending the revolt that they began upon his ascension to the throne 6 years ago.

 China 
 The Shaolin Temple (Henan) is founded (according to the Jiaqing Chongxiu Yitongzhi). (For alternate founding date, see 477 or 495).

 By topic 
 Arts and sciences 
 Aryabhata, Indian astronomer and mathematician, calculates pi (π) as ≈ 62832/20000 = 3.1416, correct to four rounded-off decimal places.
 Literature 
 The Ambrosian Iliad, an Illuminated manuscript on vellum, of the Iliad of Homer, is produced in Constantinople (approximate date).

Births 
 Abdul Mutallib, grandfather of Islamic prophet Mohammed (d. 578)
 Cadoc, Welsh abbot, saint (approximate date)
 Chlothar I, king of the Franks (d. 561)

Deaths 
 Hashim ibn 'Abd Manaf, great-grandfather of Mohammed
 Longinus of Cardala, Isaurian official, rebel leader
 Crown Prince Yuan Xun of Northern Wei (b. 483)

References